The discography of Margaret Berger, a Norwegian electropop singer-songwriter, consists of two studio albums, one compilation album, five singles and five music videos.

Berger's debut album, Chameleon, was released on 4 October 2004. The album reached number four on the Norwegian albums chart. The album did not receive an official single release, but the music video for the song "Lifetime Guarantee" was awarded a Spellemannprisen.

Her second album, Pretty Scary Silver Fairy, was released on 2 October 2006. The album reached number eight in Norway and received positive reviews. Influenced by Björk, Daft Punk and The Knife, the album was a departure from her previous effort, and featured a mixture of electronic and dance-pop music. The lead single, "Samantha", reached number six on Norwegian singles chart. Two more singles followed, "Will You Remember Me Tomorrow?" which has peaked to number 13 on Norwegian singles chart and "Robot Song". On 21 February 2011 Berger released the single "In a Box". In June 2011, her label Sony BMG issued the 4-track EP compilation Four Hits: Margaret Berger, which included the singles "Lifetime Guarantee", "Samantha", "Will You Remember Me Tomorrow?" and "Chameleon".

Berger has represented Norway in the Eurovision Song Contest 2013 second semi-final after winning the Norwegian national final on 9 February with the song "I Feed You My Love". The song has reached number four on Norwegian singles chart. On 18 May 2013 at the finals, Margaret Berger finished at 4th place with 191 points. She is currently recording her third album Chastisement in London, England. The album will include her Eurovision 2013 song, "I Feed You My Love".

Albums

Studio albums

Compilation albums

Singles

As lead artist

Music videos

References

Discographies of Norwegian artists